Fantasía Pop (Pop Fantasy) is the third studio album by the Mexican electropop band Belanova. It was released in September 2007 in Mexico, Spain, the United States and the rest of Latin America. The album was recorded in Argentina. The first single, "Baila Mi Corazón" premiered on July 2 on Mexican radio station Los 40 Principales.

The album was certified gold by AMPROFON in Mexico only three days after its release, for selling over 50,000 copies. The album entered the Mexican charts at number eighteen and went to number one in its third week. "Baila Mi Corazón" ranked in the top twenty in the U.S. Latin Pop Charts.  "Cada Que..."  went on to sell over 200,000 downloads in the United States alone. When the album was certified Platinum in March 2008 in Mexico, the band made history when it was published that digital sales of the album were five times higher than the physical sales. The album was released in Spain in early April 2008. The album won "Best Pop Album by Group or Duet" at the 2008 Latin Grammy Awards.

Track listing
All tracks by Belanova

Fantasía Pop

Fantasía Pop - Deluxe Edition
(Released 28 July 2008 in Mexico and 29 July 2008 in the United States)
CD
11-Track CD, as well as the bonus tracks:

12. "Mírame" - 3:05

13. "Baila Mi Corazón" [Mijangos & Elorza Bossa Radio Edit] - 4:01

14. "Baila Mi Corazón" [Mariano Ochoa Remix] - 4:20

15. "Baila Mi Corazón" [Imazué Latin Soul Mix Radio Edit] - 4:04

16. "Cada Que..." [DJ Raff Remix Radio Edit] - 4:47

17. "Cada Que..." [Mood-Fu Remix] - 4:00

18. "Toma Mi Mano" [Demo] - 2:09

Bonus DVD
"Baila Mi Corazón" 
"Cada Que..." 
"Toma Mi Mano" 
Making of "Cada Que..." 
Exclusive Images
Belanova - Photo Gallery

Personnel
Ricardo Arreola – guitar, bass
Denisse Guerrero – vocals
Edgar Huerta – keyboards
Production: Cachorro López & Belanova
Recording & Mixing: Mondo Mix, Buenos Aires, Argentina (except "Baila Mi Corazón" - mixed at Masterhouse, Miami).
Arrangements: Belanova
Record Engineers: Sebastián Schon (main), Demián Nava and Edgar Huerta
Mastered by Tom Baker at Precision Mastering, Los Angeles, CA.
Mixed by Cesar Sogbe
Piano on "Toma Mi Mano" by Fito Páez
Baritone Guitar on "Por Esta Vez" by Cachorro López
Acoustic Guitar on "Vestida de Azúl" and "Dulce Fantasía" by Sebastián Schon.
Photography: Fernando, Gerardo Montiel and Soni Maya.
Art Direction and Design: Pico Adworks

Charts

Certifications

References 

2007 albums
Belanova albums
Albums produced by Cachorro López
Latin Grammy Award for Best Pop Album by a Duo or Group with Vocals